Divine Mercy Sunday (also known as the Feast of the Divine Mercy) is celebrated on the Second Sunday of Easter, which concludes the Octave of Easter. The feast day is observed in the Roman Rite calendar, as well as some Anglo-Catholics of the Church of England (it is not, however, an official Anglican feast). It is originally based on the Catholic devotion to the Divine Mercy that Faustina Kowalska reported as part of her encounter with Jesus, and is associated with special promises from Jesus and indulgences issued by the Catholic Church.

The feast of Divine Mercy, according to the diary of Kowalska, receives from Jesus the biggest promises of grace related to the Devotion of Divine Mercy, in particular that a person who goes to sacramental confession (the confession may take place some days before) and receives holy communion on that day, shall obtain the total expiation of all sins and punishment. That means each person would go immediately after death to heaven without suffering in purgatory. Additionally, the Roman Catholic Church grants a plenary indulgence (observing the usual rules) with the recitation of some simple prayers.

Devotion to the Divine Mercy
Faustina Kowalska, a Polish nun, reported visions and visitations from Jesus and conversations with him. He asked her to paint the vision of his merciful divinity being poured from his Sacred Heart and specifically asked for a feast of Divine Mercy to be established on the first Sunday after Easter Sunday, so that mankind would take refuge in him:

In several entries in her diary, Kowalska reported promises of grace and mercy associated to the Feast of Divine Mercy on Mercy Sunday:

On March 23, 1937, Kowalska wrote in her diary (Notebook III, item 1044) that she had a vision that the feast of Divine Mercy would be celebrated in her local chapel, and would be attended by large crowds, and that the same celebration would be held in Rome attended by the pope. She wrote:
"The crowd was so enormous that the eye could not take it all in. Everyone was participating in the celebrations."

Divine Mercy Sunday is also the day after the culmination of the novena of the Chaplet of Divine Mercy. Kowalska wrote Jesus instructed her that the Feast of Mercy (the Sunday after Easter) be preceded by a Divine Mercy Novena which would begin on Good Friday.

The first Mass during which the Divine Mercy image was displayed was on April 28, 1935 (the Feast of Divine Mercy), the second Sunday of Easter, and was attended by Kowalska. (Diary of St. Faustina, item 420). April 28, 1935 was also the celebration of the end of the Jubilee of the Redemption by Pope Pius XI. Michael Sopocko (Kowalska's confessor) celebrated the Mass that Sunday and obtained permission to place the image within the Gate of Dawn church in Vilnius during the Mass.

Vatican approval

The devotion was actively promoted by Pope John Paul II. On April 30, 2000, the  Canonization of Faustina Kowalska took place and the second Sunday of Easter was officially designated as the Sunday of the Divine Mercy (Dominica II Paschae seu de divina misericordia) in the General Roman Calendar. On April 22, 2001, which was one year after establishing Divine Mercy Sunday, Pope John Paul II re-emphasized its message in the resurrection context of Easter:

Jesus said to St. Faustina one day:  "Humanity will never find peace until it turns with trust to Divine Mercy". Divine Mercy! This is the Easter gift that the Church receives from the risen Christ and offers to humanity.

The devotion to Divine Mercy Sunday grew rapidly after its designation by Pope John Paul II and is now widely celebrated by Catholics. The Divine Mercy image is often carried in processions on Divine Mercy Sunday, and is placed in a location in the church so that it can be venerated by those who attended the Mass.

The liturgical celebration of Divine Mercy Sunday reflects the devotional elements of Divine Mercy – the first prayer of that Mass beginning with:
Heavenly Father and God of Mercy, We no longer look for Jesus among the dead, for He is alive and has become the Lord of Life.

This opening prayer refers to divine mercy as the key element in the plan of God for salvation and emphasizes the belief that it was through mercy that God gave his only son for the redemption of mankind, after the fall of Adam.

John Paul II, who died in April 2005 on the vigil of Divine Mercy Sunday, was himself beatified on Divine Mercy Sunday, May 1, 2011, by his successor, Pope Benedict XVI, and was canonized together with Pope John XXIII on Divine Mercy Sunday, April 27, 2014, by Pope Francis.

Plenary indulgence
In June 2002, John Paul II granted indulgences to Catholics who recite specific prayers on that day, and the grants were then formally decreed by the Apostolic Penitentiary. Priests are encouraged on that day to lead the prayers in honor of Divine Mercy, inform the parishioners about the Divine Mercy, and hear confessions.

Conditions

The plenary indulgence is obtained by observing the usual dispositions that are in place for the granting of this grace through the intercession of the Catholic Church:

 Participation in the "prayers and devotions held in honor of Divine Mercy" in a church or chapel while "completely detached from the affection for a sin, even a venial sin", or recitation of the Our Father and the Creed in the presence of the Blessed Sacrament exposed or reserved in the tabernacle, adding the prayer "Merciful Jesus, I trust in you"
 Sacramental confession
 Holy Communion
 Prayer for the intentions of the pope

Additionally, the faithful who, for a justified reason beyond their control, are unable to go to a church or chapel may obtain an indulgence with the recitation of the Our Father and Creed before an image of Jesus, adding the prayer "Merciful Jesus, I trust in you", with the conditions of detachment of sin, and intention to fulfill the dispositions above as soon as possible.

If even this is impossible to achieve, the indulgence can be obtained by the faithful if they "united with those carrying out the prescribed practice for obtaining the indulgence in the usual way", and offer to Jesus a prayer and their sufferings, again with the resolution of fulfilling the normal conditions at the earliest opportunity.

References

Further reading
 
  

Catholic devotions
Catholic holy days
Eastertide
Divine Mercy
April observances
Christian Sunday observances

vi:Chúa Nhật Lòng Chúa Thương Xót